Kim Yeon-ji (born 12 May 1981) is a South Korean taekwondo practitioner. 

She won a gold medal in lightweight at the 2001 World Taekwondo Championships, and another gold medal in lightweight at the 2003 World Taekwondo Championships in Garmisch-Partenkirchen. She won a gold medal at the 2002 Asian Games.

References

External links

1981 births
Living people
South Korean female taekwondo practitioners
Taekwondo practitioners at the 2002 Asian Games
Asian Games medalists in taekwondo
Medalists at the 2002 Asian Games
Asian Games gold medalists for South Korea
World Taekwondo Championships medalists
21st-century South Korean women